Vision Aid Overseas (VAO) is a registered charity in the United Kingdom, which provides optical aid and services to developing countries in Africa.

History
In 1985, a group of British optometrists and dispensing opticians each took two weeks out of their businesses to establish clinics in Tanzania, where they tested the eyes of local people and dispensed second-hand spectacles collected in UK. After the project gained publicity via the media and resultant public support, they formalised their efforts by registering the charity Vision Aid Overseas in 1987.

Founded on the delivery of direct service to patient, since registering as a charity, VAO has operated direct service clinics in 23 countries and tested the eyes of over 600,000 patients, helping over 350,000 people to see with a pair of spectacles.

In the 1997 New Years Honours list, founder Brian Ellis was awarded the MBE.

Operations
VAO today focuses it operations around three core services:
Optical Training: Establish International Vision Centres where high quality spectacles can be manufactured and sold at an affordable price following a thorough eye examination
Optical Workshop Development: Train local healthcare workers in practical eye testing and vision health skills that equips them to work as primary eyecare workers in their local communities
Direct Service Deliver: Utilize the expertise of UK optical professionals who develop outreach services in areas away from existing facilities and who undertake teaching programmes across the developing world

VAO presently runs sustainable projects in five target countries: Ethiopia, Malawi, Sierra Leone, Uganda, and Zambia.

Support
VAO Honorary Vice Presidents include competing newsreaders Fiona Bruce of the BBC, and Sir Trevor MacDonald of ITV News. In February 2005 Bruce did the voice over for VAO's Lifeline Appeal, and in 2007 launched VAO's Annual Review.

The charity has formalised its relationship with the UK eye care industry, and is often the chosen charity supported by many dispensing opticians, and professionals via the Worshipful Company of Spectacle Makers, who collect old spectacles from customers for recycling via VAO.

The charity gained publicity in 2005 after the death of Countdown game show host Richard Whiteley. After his death, his longtime partner Kathryn Apanowicz donated three pairs of Whiteley's spectacles to VAO, who sent them with a team of optical professionals to Ethiopia, where they were fitted to three locals with the same prescription. The BBC followed this story on their Inside Out programme, which was broadcast on 19 September 2007.

References

External links

Digital Eye Strain

Optometry
Health charities in the United Kingdom
Foreign charities operating in Ethiopia
Charities based in West Sussex
1987 establishments in the United Kingdom
Worshipful Company of Spectacle Makers
Foreign charities operating in Malawi
Foreign charities operating in Sierra Leone
Foreign charities operating in Uganda
Foreign charities operating in Zambia